2012–13 FIS Cross-Country World Cup was a multi-race tournament over the season for cross-country skiers. It was the 32nd official World Cup season in cross-country skiing for men and women. The season started on 24 November 2012 in Gällivare, Sweden, and ended on 24 March 2013 in Falun, Sweden.

This season's biggest event was the Tour de Ski and the 2013 World Championships.

Calendar

Men

Women

Men's team

Women's team

Men's standings

Overall

Women's standings

Overall

Nations Cup

Points distribution
The table shows the number of points won in the 2012–13 Cross-Country Skiing World Cup for men and women.

Every skier's results in all distance races and sprint races counts towards the overall World Cup totals.

All distance races, included individual stages in Tour de Ski and in World Cup Final (which counts as 50% of a normal race), count towards the distance standings. All sprint races, including the sprint races during the Tour de Ski and the first race of the World Cup final (which counts as 50% of a normal race), count towards the sprint standings.

In mass start races bonus points are awarded to the first 10 at each bonus station.

The Nations Cup ranking is calculated by adding each country's individual competitors' scores and scores from team events. Relay events count double (see World Cup final positions), with only one team counting towards the total, while in team sprint events two teams contribute towards the total, with the usual World Cup points (100 to winning team, etc.) awarded.

Achievements
First World Cup career victory

Men
 , 23, in his 4th season – the WC 4 (15 km C Mass Start) in Canmore; his first podium

Women
 , 29, in her 12th season – the WC 8 (Sprint C) in Liberec; her first podium

First World Cup podium

Men
 , 24, in his 4th season - no. 2 in the WC 4 (15 km C Mass Start) in Canmore

Women
 , 25, in her 6th season - no. 2 in the WC 4 (10 km C Mass Start) in Canmore
 , 23, in her 5th season - no. 2 in the WC 7 (9 km F Final Climb) in Val di Fiemme
 , 30, in her 11th season - no. 3 in the WC 11 (15 km Skiathlon) in Sochi

Victories in this World Cup (all-time number of victories as of 2012/13 season in parentheses)

Men
 , 9 (33) first places
 , 4 (6) first places
  3 (13) first places
 , 3 (8) first places
 , 2 (4) first places
 , 2 (3) first places
 , 1 (11) first place
 , 1 (11) first place
 , 1 (4) first place
 , 1 (3) first place
 , 1 (2) first place
 , 1 (2) first place
 , 1 (5) first place
 , 1 (3) first place
 , 1 (1) first place

Women
 , 11 (44) first places
 , 9 (78) first places
  5 (10) first places
 , 4 (13) first places
 , 1 (2) first place
 , 1 (1) first place
 , 1 (3) first place

Footnotes

References

 
FIS Cross-Country World Cup seasons
World Cup 2012-13
World Cup 2012-13
Qualification events for the 2014 Winter Olympics
Cross Country